Thomas Nicholson (15 March 1876 – 3 October 1939) was an English cricketer. He played in twelve first-class matches for the Jamaican cricket team from 1904 to 1911.

See also
 List of Jamaican representative cricketers

References

External links
 

1876 births
1939 deaths
English cricketers
Jamaica cricketers
Cricketers from Chennai
London County cricketers
British people in colonial India
British people in British Jamaica